2019 was the sixth series of the GC32 Racing Tour. It was the first to include well-known GC32 teams Alinghi, Oman Air and Red Bull Sailing Team, following the collapse of the Extreme Sailing Series.
The 2019 season consisted of five acts, returning to Villasimius, Riva del Garda, Lagos, and Palma de Mallorca, as well as its debut in Muscat, Oman.

Events 

22-26 May: Villasimius Cup / Villasimius, Sardinia, Italy

26-30 June: GC32 World Championship / Lagos, Portugal

31 July- 4 August: 38 Copa del Rey MAPFRE / Palma de Mallorca, Spain

11-15 September: GC32 Riva Cup / Riva del Garda, Italy

6-10 November: GC32 Oman Cup / Muscat, Oman

Teams

Full-Season Teams

Alinghi 
Arnaud Psarofaghis

Bryan Mettraux

Yves Detrey

Nicolas Charbonnier

Timothé Lapauw

Black Star Sailing Team 
Christian Zuerrer

Flavio Marazzi

Florian Trüb

Adam Kay

Will Alloway

RedBull Sailing Team 
Roman Hagara

Hans Peter Steinacher

Mark Spearman

Rhys Mara

Julius Hallström

Oman Air 
Adam Minoprio

Pete Greenhalgh

Stewart Dodson

Adam Piggott

Nasser Al Mashari

ZouLou 
Erik Maris

Thierry Fouchier

Thomas le Breton

Bruno Mourniac

Nicolas Heintz

Argo 
Jason Carroll 

Sébastien Col

Nick Hutton

Alister Richardson

Scott ‘Chuck’ Norris

Part-Season Teams

Código Rojo Racing

M&G Tressis Silicius 
Iker Martinez

Team Tilt

INEOS Rebels UK  
Ben Ainslie

Oli Greber

Ben Cornish

Joey Newton

Giles Scott

NORAUTO 
Franck Cammas

Arnaud Jarlegan

Olivier Herledant

Matthieu Vandame

Devan Le Bihan

CHINAone NINGBO 
Phil Robertson

Ed Powys

Liu 'Black' Xue

Chen 'Horace' Jinhao

Liu 'Leo' Ming

Results

Overall Results

Owner-Driver Results

References

GC32 Racing Tour
2019 in sailing